The Confraternity of Catholic saints (CCS) is a Catholic organization of young people consecrated to the Trinity through the Blessed Virgin Mary and dedicated in proclaiming the gospel and promoting that the catholic view of holiness is very possible.

Overview 
The Confraternity of Catholic Saints is an organization of young people in the Philippines. The purpose of the group is to proclaim the Gospel of Jesus Christ, to promote holiness to Catholics, and to support the idea that holiness is very possible to the world, especially to the youth. It uses the lives and the works of the catholic saints to fulfill their mission and to inspire many to be holy. It pledges loyalty to the Roman Catholic Church and its teachings, to the Pope, and to the Diocesan Bishop. The Confraternity of Catholic Saints focuses its attention to the realization of the Catholic Church's universal call to holiness through their ministries.

History 

The Confraternity of Catholic Saint began on 1 October 2003 as the Ministry for the Promotion of Holy Men and Women at the Roman Catholic Diocese of Cubao dedicated to promote the new Saints of the Catholic Church. Its foundation was led by Dave Caesar Dela Cruz and Lloyd Paul Elauria, both from the said diocese. In August 2006 it changed its name to Confraternity of Catholic Saints (CCS) in the presence of the pioneer fraters of the CCS, namely (with religious name) Dave Caesar Dela Cruz (Francis Teresa Maria of the Immaculate Conception and of the Holy Cross), Lloyd Paul Elauria (Tarciso Bonaventura Maria a Croce), Weldann Lester Panganiban (John Ezekiel Maria of the Miraculous Medal and of the Cross), Matthew Taleon (Joseph Pio Maria of the Visitation of our Lady), John Felix Santos [John of Saint Mary, Mother of God], Adrian Millena (Paul Lawrence Maria of the Resurrection), Carlos Babiano (Josemaria of the Sacred Hearts of Jesus and Mary), and Roel San Miguel (John Therese Maria of the Annunciation).

On 13 July 2007 Rev. Fr. Angelo Ma. S. Legal, of the Catholic (OSB) became the Spiritual Director of the CCS.

On 24 July 2007, Director Dave Caesar Dela Cruz presented a letter and requirements requesting the Lord Bishop of Cubao, Most Rev. Honesto F. Ongtioco, D.D. for the Diocesan Recognition of the Confraternity.

At present the CSS is the Official Promoter for the Cause of Canonization for Blessed Ivan Merz of Croatia in the Philippines, the Official Group-Promoter of Blessed Alberto Marvelli of Italy in the Philippines, a recognized prayer group for the Cause of Beatification and Canonization of the Servant of God, Pope John Paul II, and Recognized Promoter of Saint Rita de Cascia (by the Mother Abbess), Monastery of Saint Rita de Cascia, Cascia, Italy.

In October 2007, Director, Dave Caesar Dela Cruz, visited the tomb of Blessed Ivan Merz in Croatia. The Confraternity was recognized by the Archbishop of Zagreb, Josip Cardinal Bozanic; the Archbishop of Sarajevo, Vinko Cardinal Puljik (Bosnian, Croatian: Vinko Puljić); and the Bishop of Banja Luka, Franjo Komarika. The Director was interviewed on the Catholic radio in Croatia. The Confraternity was also featured in some newspaper in Croatia. One of these is the magazine in Croatia, FOKUS.

The charism of the CCS is the promotion of devotion, lives and spirituality of the Catholic Saints.

On 19 March 2008, Dave Caesar Dela Cruz was appointed as the Vice Postulator for the Philippines of the Cause for the Canonization of Blessed Ivan Merz of Croatia and was recognized by the Catholic Bishops' Conference of the Philippines. Dela Cruz, being the co-founder and Director of the Confraternity, the CCS is the home office of the Vice Postulation.

Having been elected as the Vice Postulator for Blessed Ivan, on 10 May 2008 the Confraternity conducted the first feast celebration of Blessed Ivan Merz in the Philippines at the home Parish of the CCS, the Transfiguration of Our Lord Parish in Cubao, Quezon City, Philippines. Mass was celebrated along with the extension of the Blessed Ivan Merz Scholarship Program.

On 1 June 2008, the start of the canonical year for CCS, the CCS has launched its official manual, which was also presented to the Bishop of Cubao as part of the needed documents for the Diocesan Recognition. The CCS Official Manual contains the norms of the CCS, the Constitution and By-laws, and other important documents like decrees of the Director, prayers for the CCS, and letters of several Bishops.

On 5 October 2008, the fifth anniversary of the Confraternity, four pioneer fraters made their solemn consecration and perpetual profession. On 6 November 2008, the Prefect of the Congregation for the Causes of Saints sent a message for the Confraternity, marking a step of recognition from the Congregation.

The CCS is currently present in two dioceses in the Philippines, the Dioceses of Cubao and Kalookan, with Cooperators around the country. On 11 February 2009, the Confraternity had its new presence at the Holy Cross Parish, Diliman, Quezon City. In May of the same year (2009), the Community welcomed another member, in the person of Lloyd Danielle Flores (James Michael Maria of the Transfiguration of the Lord). This was in-line with the First Anniversary of the Promulgation of the CCS Manual and the recognition of the CCS Scholars for the Year 2009-2010.

At the Start of the Year 2010, the Confraternity, through its director, declared the said year as the Year of Holiness. This is to reiterate the need of the CCS to fulfill its mission and motto to be Holy. With this, a Year dedicated to Mary is also declared, calling all members to call upon the Blessed Virgin Mary and ask her intercession as the Year of Holiness is observed.

Logo and motto 
The motto of the CCS is taken from the Holy Scripture in the book of the 1st epistle of Peter (1:16), "Sancti eritis, quia ego sanctus sum," translated as "Be holy for I am holy." The motto describes the CCS's identity as an organization for the holiness of Christ's faithful.

In the official logo, the letters C, C, and S are formed like a heart which symbolizes the ministry and core values (Commitment, Charity, and Service) of the Confraternity of Catholic Saints (CCS) being embedded in the hearts of its members. The three flames above the heart at the left symbolize the three inspirations of the Confraternity: Blessed Teresa of Calcutta, Saint Josemaria Escriva, and Saint Louis de Montfort while the larger flame at the right symbolizes Saint Therese of the Child Jesus and of the Holy Face, the secondary patroness of the Confraternity. The letter "M" inside the heart symbolizes the Blessed Virgin Mary, the Mother and Queen of the CCS. The cross at the center of the logo symbolizes Jesus, the center and life of the Confraterity.

Ministries 
The ministries of the CCS are defined according to the Constitution and By-laws given last 1 June 2008.

 To promote the devotion to and lives of the Holy Men and Women recognized by the Roman Catholic Church by Canonization, Beatification, and Recognition of Heroic Virtues, including those from the churches in communion with Rome.
 To help parishes, religious congregations and associations foster devotion to their own saints (their patrons, founders, and/or members).
 To take care of relics of the saints that the confraternity members and/or the Diocese owns.
 To host a public viewing and veneration of the relics of saints in parishes, communities, schools, hospitals, houses, and offices.
 To help the Catholic Church stop different kinds of abuses to relics of saints and report it to the competent ecclesiastical authorities (e.g. the Local Ordinary) and/or to the postulators.
 To conduct spiritual activities according to the spirituality of a particular saint through seminars, recollections, retreats, pilgrimages, etc.
 To visit the sick and those who need spiritual assistance and pray for them through the intercession of the saints.

Structure 
The Confraternity of Catholic Saints consists of two groups these are: the Fraters Group (men who are consecrated and living within the area of Metro Manila and serving full-time the CCS' needs) and the Cooperators Group (who wish to share in the mission of the CCS cooperating in or outside the Metro Manila area).

The Cooperators are the "Friends of Catholic Saints" (men) and the "Daughters of Mary, Queen of All Saints" (women). The Cooperators was established by the Director 15 October 2007 through his decree no. 1, series of 2007, given in Zagreb, Croatia. The Cooperators is also open to Priests and Religious who wanted to share with the mission of the Confraternity and proclaim holiness in whatever way possible, especially through spiritual direction and advise.

Blessed Ivan Scholarship Fund 

The Blessed Ivan Scholarship Fund is a project of the CCS in cooperation with the Official Postulation of Blessed Ivan Merz in Croatia. Started in June 2007, its purpose is to help the financially unstable but fitting youth to have a quality education and to get equipped for his/her future.

References

External links 
 

Confraternities